Luis Jubert Salieti (1900–1936) was a Spanish military commander who participated in the Spanish Civil War.

In July 1936, at the outbreak of the war, he held the rank of infantry captain. After the start of the war he marched to the Aragon Front enlisted in the Ortiz Column, made up mostly of anarchist militants. He died in December 1936, during a military operation in the Belchite sector. After his death, the old column was militarized into the 25th Division, also called the "Jubert Division" in his honor.

References

Bibliography 

1900 births
1936 deaths
Spanish military personnel of the Spanish Civil War (Republican faction)